A pig toilet (sometimes called a "pig sty latrine") is a simple type of dry toilet consisting of an outhouse mounted over a pigsty, with a chute or hole connecting the two. The pigs consume the feces of the users of the toilet, as well as other food.

History
Pig toilets ( zhūquānmáokēng) were once common in rural China, where a single Chinese ideogram signifies both "pigsty" and "privy". Funerary models of pig toilets from the Han dynasty (206 BC to AD 220) prove that it was an ancient custom. These arrangements have been strongly discouraged by the Chinese authorities in recent years, although as late as 2005 they could still be found in remote northern provinces.

Chinese influence may have spread the use of pig toilets to Okinawa (Okinawan: ふーる (fūru) / 風呂) before World War II, and also to the Manchu people during the Qing Dynasty period.

Pig toilets were also used in parts of India such as Goa. A 2003 survey of sanitary arrangements in Goa and Kerala found that 22.7% of the population still used pig toilets.

On Jejudo, a volcanic island of South Korea that is home to a breed of black pig, the pig toilets were known as dottongsi. These pigsty toilets were still in use in the 1960s.

Fishpond toilet
In China, "Family dwellings are commonly built close to the fish pond with toilets overhanging the pond to facilitate fertilization. ... Some pigsties as well as latrines for humans are built on the adjacent dike so as to overhang the pond." But by 1988, these fish pond toilets were falling out of favour, as the farmers found it more useful to ferment human and pig excrement together, and apply it to the aquaculture ponds as needed.

In Vietnam, the traditional fish pond toilet, which was described as "widespread" as recently as 2008, polluted the waterways, but was perceived as more hygienic (less smelly) than various modern alternatives that the government was pressing on the villagers.

See also
Coprophagia
History of water supply and sanitation
Toilet god

References

Animals and humans
Pigs
Toilets
Fish and humans
Mammals and humans